Rosshan Andrrews (born 6 January 1975) is an Indian film director who mainly works in Malayalam cinema.

Biography

Rosshan Andrrews was born to Moolakuzhi Nedumparampil Andrews and Burney. He attended St. Aloysious Thrissur and Cochin College, Eranakulam.

Personal life

Roshan is married to Ancy and the couple has three children: Anjelina, Ryan and Ana Bella.

Career 

His first movie was the 2005 Malayalam movie Udayananu Tharam starring Mohanlal and Meena. After the success of this movie, Rosshan Andrrews directed another movie in 2006 named Notebook. This movie had newcomers Mariya Roy, Parvathy, Roma and Skanda Ashok .

Awards
Kerala State Film Awards
 2005 – Kerala State Film Award for Best Debut Director – Udayananu Tharam
 2006 – Kerala State Film Award for Second Best Film – Notebook
 2009 – Kerala State Film Award for Best Popular Film – Evidam Swargamanu

 Filmfare Awards South
 2006 – Filmfare Award for Best Film – Malayalam – Notebook
 2006 – Filmfare Award for Best Director – Malayalam – Notebook

Filmography

As director

Writer

Actor

Television shows as judge 
Tharolsavam
Nakshatradeepangal

Recurring collaborators

References

External links 
 

Malayalam film directors
Film directors from Kerala
Malayali people
Living people
21st-century Indian film directors
Kerala State Film Award winners
Filmfare Awards South winners
1975 births